The Old Testament (OT) is the first division of the Christian biblical canon, which is based primarily upon the 24 books of the Hebrew Bible or Tanakh, a collection of ancient religious Hebrew and occasionally Aramaic writings by the Israelites. The second division of Christian Bibles is the New Testament, written in the Koine Greek language.

The Old Testament consists of many distinct books by various authors produced over a period of centuries. Christians traditionally divide the Old Testament into four sections: the first five books or Pentateuch (corresponds to the Jewish Torah); the history books telling the history of the Israelites, from their conquest of Canaan to their defeat and exile in Babylon; the poetic and "Wisdom books" dealing, in various forms, with questions of good and evil in the world; and the books of the biblical prophets, warning of the consequences of turning away from God.

The books that compose the Old Testament canon and their order and names differ between various branches of Christianity. The canons of the Eastern Orthodox and Oriental Orthodox Churches comprise up to 49 books; the Catholic canon comprises 46 books; and the most common Protestant canon comprises 39 books.

There are 39 books common to essentially all Christian canons. They correspond to the 24 books of the Tanakh, with some differences of order, and there are some differences in text. The additional number reflects the splitting of several texts (Samuel, Kings, Chronicles, Ezra–Nehemiah, and the Twelve Minor Prophets) into separate books in Christian Bibles. The books that are part of the Christian Old Testament but that are not part of the Hebrew canon are sometimes described as deuterocanonical. In general, Catholic and Orthodox churches include these books in the Old Testament. Most Protestant Bibles do not include the deuterocanonical books in their canon, but some versions of Anglican and Lutheran Bibles place such books in a separate section called apocrypha. These books are ultimately derived from the earlier Greek Septuagint collection of the Hebrew scriptures and are also Jewish in origin. Some are also contained in the Dead Sea Scrolls.

Content

The Old Testament contains 39 (Protestant), 46 (Catholic), or more (Orthodox and other) books, divided, very broadly, into the Pentateuch (Torah), the historical books, the "wisdom" books and the prophets.

The table below uses the spellings and names present in modern editions of the Christian Bible, such as the Catholic New American Bible Revised Edition and the Protestant Revised Standard Version and English Standard Version. The spelling and names in both the 1609–F10 Douay Old Testament (and in the 1582 Rheims New Testament) and the 1749 revision by Bishop Challoner (the edition currently in print used by many Catholics, and the source of traditional Catholic spellings in English) and in the Septuagint differ from those spellings and names used in modern editions which are derived from the Hebrew Masoretic text.

For the Orthodox canon, Septuagint titles are provided in parentheses when these differ from those editions. For the Catholic canon, the Douaic titles are provided in parentheses when these differ from those editions. Likewise, the King James Version references some of these books by the traditional spelling when referring to them in the New Testament, such as "Esaias" (for Isaiah).

In the spirit of ecumenism more recent Catholic translations (e.g. the New American Bible, Jerusalem Bible, and ecumenical translations used by Catholics, such as the Revised Standard Version Catholic Edition) use the same "standardized" (King James Version) spellings and names as Protestant Bibles (e.g. 1 Chronicles as opposed to the Douaic 1 Paralipomenon, 1–2 Samuel and 1–2 Kings instead of 1–4 Kings) in those books which are universally considered canonical, the protocanonicals.

The Talmud (the Jewish commentary on the scriptures) in Bava Batra 14b gives a different order for the books in Nevi'im and Ketuvim. This order is also cited in Mishneh Torah Hilchot Sefer Torah 7:15. The order of the books of the Torah is universal through all denominations of Judaism and Christianity.

The disputed books, included in most canons but not in others, are often called the Biblical apocrypha, a term that is sometimes used specifically to describe the books in the Catholic and Orthodox canons that are absent from the Jewish Masoretic Text and most modern Protestant Bibles. They are present in a few historic Protestant versions; the German Luther Bible included such books, as did the English 1611 King James Version.

Empty table cells indicate that a book is absent from that canon.

Several of the books in the Eastern Orthodox canon are also found in the appendix to the Latin Vulgate, formerly the official Bible of the Roman Catholic Church.

Historicity

Early scholarship 
Some of the stories of the Pentateuch may derive from older sources. American science writer Homer W. Smith points out similarities between the Genesis creation narrative and that of the Sumerian Epic of Gilgamesh, such as the inclusion of the creation of the first man (Adam/Enkidu) in the Garden of Eden, a tree of knowledge, a tree of life, and a deceptive serpent. Scholars such as Andrew R. George point out the similarity of the Genesis flood narrative and the Gilgamesh flood myth. Similarities between the origin story of Moses and that of Sargon of Akkad were noted by psychoanalyst Otto Rank in 1909 and popularized by 20th century writers, such as H. G. Wells and Joseph Campbell. Jacob Bronowski writes that, "the Bible is ... part folklore and part record. History is ... written by the victors, and the Israelis, when they burst through [Jericho], became the carriers of history."

Recent scholarship 
In 2007, a scholar of Judaism Lester L. Grabbe explained that earlier biblical scholars such as Julius Wellhausen (1844–1918) could be described as 'maximalist', accepting biblical text unless it has been disproven. Continuing in this tradition, both "the 'substantial historicity' of the patriarchs" and "the unified conquest of the land" were widely accepted in the United States until about the 1970s. Contrarily, Grabbe says that those in his field now "are all minimalistsat least, when it comes to the patriarchal period and the settlement. ... [V]ery few are willing to operate [as maximalists]."

Composition

The first five books—Genesis, Exodus, Leviticus, book of Numbers and Deuteronomy—reached their present form in the Persian period (538–332 BC), and their authors were the elite of exilic returnees who controlled the Temple at that time. The books of Joshua, Judges, Samuel and Kings follow, forming a history of Israel from the Conquest of Canaan to the Siege of Jerusalem  BC. There is a broad consensus among scholars that these originated as a single work (the so-called "Deuteronomistic History") during the Babylonian exile of the 6th century BC.

The two Books of Chronicles cover much the same material as the Pentateuch and Deuteronomistic history and probably date from the 4th century BC. Chronicles, and Ezra–Nehemiah, was probably finished during the 3rd century BC. Catholic and Orthodox Old Testaments contain two (Catholic Old Testament) to four (Orthodox) Books of the Maccabees, written in the 2nd and 1st centuries BC.

These history books make up around half the total content of the Old Testament. Of the remainder, the books of the various prophets—Isaiah, Jeremiah, Ezekiel, and the twelve "minor prophets"—were written between the 8th and 6th centuries BC, with the exceptions of Jonah and Daniel, which were written much later. The "wisdom" books—Job, Proverbs, Ecclesiastes, Psalms, Song of Songs—have various dates: Proverbs possibly was completed by the Hellenistic time (332–198 BC), though containing much older material as well; Job completed by the 6th century BC; Ecclesiastes by the 3rd century BC.

Themes
Throughout the Old Testament, God is consistently depicted as the one who created the world. Although the God of the Old Testament is not consistently presented as the only God who exists, he is always depicted as the only God whom Israel is to worship, or the one "true God", that only Yahweh (or ) is Almighty.

The Old Testament stresses the special relationship between God and his chosen people, Israel, but includes instructions for proselytes as well. This relationship is expressed in the biblical covenant (contract) between the two, received by Moses. The law codes in books such as Exodus and especially Deuteronomy are the terms of the contract: Israel swears faithfulness to God, and God swears to be Israel's special protector and supporter. However, The Jewish Study Bible denies that the word covenant ( in Hebrew) means "contract"; in the ancient Near East, a covenant would have been sworn before the gods, who would be its enforcers. As God is part of the agreement, and not merely witnessing it, The Jewish Study Bible instead interprets the term to refer to a pledge.

Further themes in the Old Testament include salvation, redemption, divine judgment, obedience and disobedience, faith and faithfulness, among others. Throughout there is a strong emphasis on ethics and ritual purity, both of which God demands, although some of the prophets and wisdom writers seem to question this, arguing that God demands social justice above purity, and perhaps does not even care about purity at all. The Old Testament's moral code enjoins fairness, intervention on behalf of the vulnerable, and the duty of those in power to administer justice righteously. It forbids murder, bribery and corruption, deceitful trading, and many sexual misdemeanours. All morality is traced back to God, who is the source of all goodness.

The problem of evil plays a large part in the Old Testament. The problem the Old Testament authors faced was that a good God must have had just reason for bringing disaster (meaning notably, but not only, the Babylonian exile) upon his people. The theme is played out, with many variations, in books as different as the histories of Kings and Chronicles, the prophets like Ezekiel and Jeremiah, and in the wisdom books like Job and Ecclesiastes.

Formation

The process by which scriptures became canons and Bibles was a long one, and its complexities account for the many different Old Testaments which exist today. Timothy H. Lim, a professor of Hebrew Bible and Second Temple Judaism at the University of Edinburgh, identifies the Old Testament as "a collection of authoritative texts of apparently divine origin that went through a human process of writing and editing." He states that it is not a magical book, nor was it literally written by God and passed to mankind. By about the 5th century BC, Jews saw the five books of the Torah (the Old Testament Pentateuch) as having authoritative status; by the 2nd century BC, the Prophets had a similar status, although without quite the same level of respect as the Torah; beyond that, the Jewish scriptures were fluid, with different groups seeing authority in different books.

Greek

Hebrew texts began to be translated into Greek in Alexandria in about 280 and continued until about 130 BC. These early Greek translations  supposedly commissioned by Ptolemy II Philadelphus  were called the Septuagint from the supposed number of translators involved (hence its abbreviation "LXX"). This Septuagint remains the basis of the Old Testament in the Eastern Orthodox Church.

It varies in many places from the Masoretic Text and includes numerous books no longer considered canonical in some traditions: 1 and 2 Esdras, Judith, Tobit, 3 and 4 Maccabees, the Book of Wisdom, Sirach, and Baruch. Early modern biblical criticism typically explained these variations as intentional or ignorant corruptions by the Alexandrian scholars, but most recent scholarship holds it is simply based on early source texts differing from those later used by the Masoretes in their work.

The Septuagint was originally used by Hellenized Jews whose knowledge of Greek was better than Hebrew. However, the texts came to be used predominantly by gentile converts to Christianity and by the early Church as its scripture, Greek being the lingua franca of the early Church. The three most acclaimed early interpreters were Aquila of Sinope, Symmachus the Ebionite, and Theodotion; in his Hexapla, Origen placed his edition of the Hebrew text beside its transcription in Greek letters and four parallel translations: Aquila's, Symmachus's, the Septuagint's, and Theodotion's. The so-called "fifth" and "sixth editions" were two other Greek translations supposedly miraculously discovered by students outside the towns of Jericho and Nicopolis: these were added to Origen's Octapla.

In 331, Constantine I commissioned Eusebius to deliver fifty Bibles for the Church of Constantinople. Athanasius recorded Alexandrian scribes around 340 preparing Bibles for Constans. Little else is known, though there is plenty of speculation. For example, it is speculated that this may have provided motivation for canon lists and that Codex Vaticanus and Codex Sinaiticus are examples of these Bibles. Together with the Peshitta and Codex Alexandrinus, these are the earliest extant Christian Bibles. There is no evidence among the canons of the First Council of Nicaea of any determination on the canon. However, Jerome (347–420), in his Prologue to Judith, claims that the Book of Judith was "found by the Nicene Council to have been counted among the number of the Sacred Scriptures".

Latin

In Western Christianity or Christianity in the Western half of the Roman Empire, Latin had displaced Greek as the common language of the early Christians, and in 382 AD Pope Damasus I commissioned Jerome, the leading scholar of the day, to produce an updated Latin Bible to replace the Vetus Latina, which was a Latin translation of the Septuagint. Jerome's work, called the Vulgate, was a direct translation from Hebrew, since he argued for the superiority of the Hebrew texts in correcting the Septuagint on both philological and theological grounds. His Vulgate Old Testament became the standard Bible used in the Western Church, specifically as the Sixto-Clementine Vulgate, while the Churches in the East continued, and continue, to use the Septuagint.

Jerome, however, in the Vulgate's prologues describes some portions of books in the Septuagint not found in the Hebrew Bible as being non-canonical (he called them apocrypha); for Baruch, he mentions by name in his Prologue to Jeremiah and notes that it is neither read nor held among the Hebrews, but does not explicitly call it apocryphal or "not in the canon". The Synod of Hippo (in 393), followed by the Council of Carthage (397) and the Council of Carthage (419), may be the first council that explicitly accepted the first canon which includes the books that did not appear in the Hebrew Bible; the councils were under significant influence of Augustine of Hippo, who regarded the canon as already closed.

Protestant canon
In the 16th century, the Protestant reformers sided with Jerome; yet although most Protestant Bibles now have only those books that appear in the Hebrew Bible, the order is that of the Greek Bible.

Rome then officially adopted a canon, the Canon of Trent, which is seen as following Augustine's Carthaginian Councils or the Council of Rome, and includes most, but not all, of the Septuagint (3 Ezra and 3 and 4 Maccabees are excluded); the Anglicans after the English Civil War adopted a compromise position, restoring the 39 Articles and keeping the extra books that were excluded by the Westminster Confession of Faith, both for private study and for reading in churches but not for establishing any doctrine, while Lutherans kept them for private study, gathered in an appendix as biblical apocrypha.

Other versions
While the Hebrew, Greek and Latin versions of the Hebrew Bible are the best known Old Testaments, there were others. At much the same time as the Septuagint was being produced, translations were being made into Aramaic, the language of Jews living in Palestine and the Near East and likely the language of Jesus: these are called the Aramaic Targums, from a word meaning "translation", and were used to help Jewish congregations understand their scriptures.

For Aramaic Christians there was a Syriac translation of the Hebrew Bible called the Peshitta, as well as versions in Coptic (the everyday language of Egypt in the first Christian centuries, descended from ancient Egyptian), Ethiopic (for use in the Ethiopian church, one of the oldest Christian churches), Armenian (Armenia was the first to adopt Christianity as its official religion), and Arabic.

Christian theology

Christianity is based on the belief that the historical Jesus is also the Christ, as in the Confession of Peter. This belief is in turn based on Jewish understandings of the meaning of the Hebrew term Messiah, which, like the Greek "Christ", means "anointed". In the Hebrew Scriptures, it describes a king anointed with oil on his accession to the throne: he becomes "The 's anointed" or Yahweh's Anointed.

By the time of Jesus, some Jews expected that a flesh and blood descendant of David (the "Son of David") would come to establish a real Jewish kingdom in Jerusalem, instead of the Roman province of Judaea. Others stressed the Son of Man, a distinctly other-worldly figure who would appear as a judge at the end of time. Some expounded a synthesised view of both positions, where a messianic kingdom of this world would last for a set period and be followed by the other-worldly age or World to Come.

Some thought the Messiah was already present, but unrecognised due to Israel's sins; some thought that the Messiah would be announced by a forerunner, probably Elijah (as promised by the prophet Malachi, whose book now ends the Old Testament and precedes Mark's account of John the Baptist). However, no view of the Messiah as based on the Old Testament predicted a Messiah who would suffer and die for the sins of all people. The story of Jesus' death, therefore, involved a profound shift in meaning from the Old Testament tradition.

The name "Old Testament" reflects Christianity's understanding of itself as the  fulfilment of Jeremiah's prophecy of a New Covenant (which is similar to "testament" and often conflated) to replace the existing covenant between God and Israel (Jeremiah 31:31). The emphasis, however, has shifted from Judaism's understanding of the covenant as a racially- or tribally-based pledge between God and the Jewish people, to one between God and any person of faith who is "in Christ".

See also
 Abrogation of Old Covenant laws
 Biblical and Quranic narratives
 Book of Job in Byzantine illuminated manuscripts
 Criticism of the Bible
 Expounding of the Law
 Genealogies of Genesis
 Law and Gospel
 List of ancient legal codes
 List of Hebrew Bible manuscripts
 Marcion of Sinope
 Non-canonical books referenced in the Bible
 Quotations from the Hebrew Bible in the New Testament

Explanatory notes

Citations

General and cited references 
 
 
 
 
 
 
 
 
 
 
 .

Further reading
 Anderson, Bernhard. Understanding the Old Testament. 
 Bahnsen, Greg, et al., Five Views on Law and Gospel (Grand Rapids: Zondervan, 1993).
 .
 .
 
 .
 .
 .
 .
 .
 .
 .
 .
  (hardback),  (paperback).

External links

 . Full texts of the Old (and New) Testaments including the full Roman and Orthodox Catholic canons
  - Tanakh
  Protestant Old Testament on a single page
 . Extensive online Old Testament resources (including commentaries)
 
 
 : Old Testament stories and commentary
  – Biblia Hebraica Stuttgartensia and the King James Version

 
Christian terminology